The Ministry of Railways (more correctly translated as Ministry/People's Commisariat of Transportation) oversaw Soviet Railways, which operated the railways of the Soviet Union. It was divided into 32 agencies, which among them had millions of employees. The ministry was responsible for centralized departments (such as electrification), which applied to all subsidiaries.

Before 1946 the ministry was known as the People's Commissariat for Railways, although the term "Ministry of Railways" had been used by the pre-Soviet ministry (founded in 1865).

Commissars and Ministers 
The following persons headed the Commissariat/Ministry as commissars (narkoms), ministers, and deputy ministers during the Soviet era:
Source:
 Ivan Kovalev (19.3.1946 - 5.6.1948)
 Boris Beshchev (5.6.1948 - 14.1.1977)
 Ivan Pavlovsky (14.1.1977 - 29.11.1982)
 Nikolai Konarev (1.12.1982 - 26.10.1990)
 Leonid Matyukhin (8.5.1991 - 24.8.1991)

See also

 Ministry of Transport (Russia)
 Rail transport in the Soviet Union

References 

Railways
Rail transport in the Soviet Union
Soviet Union, Railways
1991 disestablishments in the Soviet Union
1946 establishments in the Soviet Union
Soviet Union
Transport organizations based in the Soviet Union